The Hercules Cluster (Abell 2151) is a cluster of about 200 galaxies some 500 million light-years distant in the constellation Hercules. It is rich in spiral galaxies and shows many interacting galaxies. The cluster is part of the larger Hercules Supercluster, which is itself part of the much larger Great Wall super-structure.

The cluster's brightest member is the giant elliptical galaxy NGC 6041.

See also
 Abell catalogue
 List of Abell clusters
 X-ray Astronomy

External links

Hercules Cluster — University of Alabama

References

 
2151
Hercules Superclusters
Abell richness class 2
Galaxy clusters